Earl Holmes Bell (born August 25, 1955) is a retired American pole vaulter. He competed at the 1976, 1984 and 1988 Olympics and won a bronze medal in 1984, placing fourth in 1988 and sixth in 1976.

He also briefly held the world record in 1976, and coached several of America's leading vaulters during his retirement years. In 2002, he was inducted into the National Track and Field Hall of Fame.

Biography
 Bell was born in Panama to William "Papa" K. Bell and Yola Zimmerman Bell. His father was a medical doctor, a Masters Record Holder pole vaulter, and attended the University of Arkansas. The family moved from Panama to Jonesboro, Arkansas in 1960.

In 1973, Bell entered Arkansas State University. He graduated in 1988 with a BSc degree in accounting. While attending Arkansas State, Bell won the NCAA title in 1975–77. He also won the AAU championships in 1976 and 1984, placing third in 1981. In addition to participating in the Olympics, Bell won a gold medal at the 1975 Pan American Games and finished fifth in 1991.

Bell came to the 1976 U.S. Olympic Trials as the world record holder. At the trials, he lent his pole to David Roberts, who broke his pole. Roberts won the trials with a new world record, and placed third at the Olympics, while Bell finished second and sixth, respectively.

Coaching career

After retiring from competitions Bell established Bell Athletics outside of Jonesboro, where he coached Jeff Hartwig, Derek Miles, Kellie Suttle, Daniel Ryland, and Jillian Schwartz, among other top pole vaulters.

Bell is married and has three children: Drew, Sam, and Henry.

Rankings
Rare among vaulters, Bell managed to stay relatively healthy and productive for a long career, gaining US rankings among the best for 16 consecutive years in the Track and Field News annual rankings.

References

External links

 Bell Athletics Training and Camps
 

1955 births
American male pole vaulters
Arkansas State University alumni
Athletes (track and field) at the 1975 Pan American Games
Athletes (track and field) at the 1976 Summer Olympics
Athletes (track and field) at the 1984 Summer Olympics
Athletes (track and field) at the 1988 Summer Olympics
Athletes (track and field) at the 1991 Pan American Games
Goodwill Games medalists in athletics
Living people
Olympic bronze medalists for the United States in track and field
Medalists at the 1975 Pan American Games
Medalists at the 1984 Summer Olympics
Pan American Games gold medalists for the United States
Pan American Games medalists in athletics (track and field)
People from Arkansas
People from Craighead County, Arkansas
People from Jonesboro, Arkansas
People from Panamá District
Track and field athletes from Arkansas
World Athletics Indoor Championships medalists
World record holders in masters athletics
World record setters in athletics (track and field)
Competitors at the 1986 Goodwill Games